Norwegian pop group Minor Majority was formed by Pål Angelskår and Andreas Berczelly as a studio project in the spring of 2000. Their first record, Walking Home from Nicole's, was released one year later with significant help from singer/songwriter Karen Jo Fields.

History
In November 2001, the band saw the addition of guitarist Jon Arild Stieng and the trio went on tour for the first time in the spring of 2002. Berczelly left the band and concentrated full-time on producing, which he has done for the band ever since.

The band's next album, If I Told You, You Were Beautiful, was recorded in Stieng's house in Oslo that same summer, and was released in October. Keyboardist Harald Sommerstad joined Minor Majority for their subsequent tour of spring 2003.

Prior to the Norwegian Quart-festivalen the same year, the band was extended further by drummer Halvor Høgh Winsnes (Fast Winston Doom of Thulsa Doom) and bassist Henrik Widerøe. The group was complete, and in the late summer, Up for You & I was recorded at Sommerstad's cabin near Halden in the south of Norway. The album was released in January 2004, and was an immediate success, boasting 24 weeks on the official Norwegian albums chart, a gold record, and numerous award nominations for best Norwegian pop album of the year.

After the following tour of more than 100 gigs both nationally and abroad (France, Switzerland, and Germany), the band spent the greater part of 2005 in Berczelly's studio, and released their fourth album, Reasons to Hang Around, in January 2006. For it, they were awarded the Norwegian Grammy equivalent, Spellemannsprisen.

2007 saw the release of the compilation album Candy Store. After this release, Minor Majority embarked on a Norwegian tour in September, followed by tours of Germany, France, and Switzerland during the first four months of 2008. The band stated in 2007 that they intended to have a pause from making music, but that they eventually would make at least one more album.

In 2009 they released their next record, Either Way I Think You Know, which reached number eleven on the Norwegian charts.

In September 2018, Minor Majority announced that they would release their sixth studio album in January 2019. The album was titled Napkin Poetry. The first single, "Another Year", was a duet with Linnea Dale.

Solo work
In September 2012, frontman Pål Angelskår released his first solo album, Follow Me, reaching sixteenth place in the Norwegian charts.

Band members
Current
 Pål Angelskår – vocals, guitar
 Jon Arild Stieng – guitars, vocals
 Harald Sommerstad – keyboards
 Henrik Harr Widerøe – bass, banjo, vocals
 Halvor Høgh Winsnes – drums

Past
 Andreas Berczelly

Discography
Studio albums

Compilations

Live albums

Singles

References

External links
 
 Minor Majority page on MySpace

Spellemannprisen winners
Norwegian musical groups